The 1909 Wake Forest Baptists football team was an American football team that represented Wake Forest College during the 1909 college football season.

Schedule

References

Wake Forest
Wake Forest Demon Deacons football seasons
Wake Forest Baptists football